Montréal-Outremont was a former provincial electoral district in the Montreal region of Quebec, Canada that elected members to the Legislative Assembly of Quebec.

It was created for the 1939 election from part of Westmount electoral district.  Its final election was in 1962.  It disappeared in the 1966 election and its successor electoral district was Outremont.

Members of the Legislative Assembly
 Henri Groulx, Liberal (1939–1953)
 Georges-Émile Lapalme, Liberal (1953–1966)

References
 Election results (National Assembly)
 Election results (QuebecPolitique.com)

Former provincial electoral districts of Quebec